Wenceslas I, Duke of Saxe-Wittenberg ( – 15 May 1388, in Celle) from the House of Ascania ruled from 1370 to 1388 and was a prince-elector of the Holy Roman Empire as well as Prince of Lüneburg. He was the son of Rudolf I and his 3rd wife, Agnes of Lindow-Ruppin.

Life 
In 1370 Wenceslas succeeded his brother Rudolf II. In 1376 he took part, as a prince-elector, in the election of Wenceslas IV of Bohemia as King of Germany and in 1377 stood by Emperor Charles IV in the Altmark. He was frequently active in the affairs of the empire on the side of the emperor. Charles IV granted Albert of Saxe-Wittenberg and his uncle Wenceslas I - and their house - the underlying entitlement to Brunswick and Lüneburg, but the two of them were unsuccessful in claiming this right through the Lüneburg War of Succession. In 1388 Wenceslas finally lost his claim at the battle of Winsen an der Aller.

He was in conflict with the Duke of Brabant over the right to carry the Imperial Sword ahead of the emperor.

He made state peace treaties with Anhalt, Magdeburg and Meißen.

During the siege of Celle Wenceslas died suddenly of a serious illness. Even his contemporaries suspected that he had been administered poison and that that was the cause of death. According to other traditional accounts, he died on 18 August 1402 which has however caused confusion over his grave.

Descendants 
On 23 January 1376 Wenceslas married Cecilia of Carrara (d. 1435), daughter of Francis of Carrara (born 29 September 1325 in Padua – died 6 October 1393 in Monza), Count of Padua.
They had the following children:
 Rudolf III, Duke of Saxe-Wittenberg
 Wenceslas (died 1402)
 Erich (died as child)
 Anna (died 1426) who married Frederick I, Duke of Brunswick-Lüneburg
 Albert III (died 1422) Elector of Saxony
 Margaret of Saxony who married Bernhard of Brunswick-Lüneburg

Ancestors

References

Literature 
 Lorenz Friedrich Beck: Herrschaft and Territorium des Herzöge of Saxe-Wittenberg (1212–1422). Potsdam, 2000. 
 Heinrich Kühne: Die Askanier. Drei Kastanien Verlag, 1999.  
 Georg Hirschfeld: Geschichte der Sächsisch-Askanischen Prince-Electoren. Julius Sittenfeld, Berlin 1884.

External links 
 http://www.genealogie-mittelalter.de/Wenceslas Prince-Elector of Saxe-Wittenberg
 

Prince-electors of Saxony
Princes of Lüneburg
Dukes of Saxe-Wittenberg
House of Ascania
1388 deaths
Year of birth unknown